Salazar Colleges of Science and Institute of Technology (SCSIT) is educational institution of basic education and higher learning in Cebu City, Philippines.

Programs Offering
College of Business and Hospitality Management
BS in Business Administration – Major in Marketing
BS in Hotel and Restaurant Management
Associate in Hotel and Restaurant Management
College of Computer Studies
BS in Information Technology
Associate in Computer Technology
College of Education
BS in Elementary Education
BS in Secondary Education
College of Engineering
BS in Civil Engineering
BS in Computer Engineering
BS in Electrical Engineering
BS in Electronics Communication Engineering
College of Criminology
BS in Criminology
College of Nursing
Associate in Vocational Nursing
Associate in Practical Nursing
Licensed Practical Nursing
Nursing Aide
Care giving
Midwifery
College of Maritime
BS in Marine Transportation
BS in Marine Engineering
Associate in Marine Engineering
Basic Seaman Course

References

Universities and colleges in Cebu City